Kaffeklubben Sø is a lake on Kaffeklubben Island, an island off the northern tip of Greenland (Sø means lake in Danish). It has been described as the world's most northerly lake. It was formed about 3,500 years ago when glacial retreat allowed rain to collect as a lake.

References

Lakes of Greenland